The 1st Road to Le Mans is an automobile endurance event that took place on 18 June 2016. It was the second round of the 2016 GT3 Le Mans Cup. The race was run at the 13.629 km Circuit de la Sarthe supporting the 2016 24 Hours of Le Mans. In contrast to the usual 2-hour races in the series, this race was run over 1-hour. The race was open to LMP3 class cars for which it was a non-championship event.

Qualifying

Race

Race result
The minimum number of laps for classification (70% of the overall winning car's race distance) was 7 laps. Class winners are in bold.

References

2016 in French motorsport